Tsoukalaiika may refer to the following places in Greece:

Tsoukalaiika, Achaea, a village in the municipal unit Vrachnaiika, Achaea
Tsoukalaiika, Messenia, a village in the municipal unit Meligalas, Messenia